Mahatma Gandhi Road  also known as MG Road is a road in Bangalore, India. It runs east from Trinity Circle at one end to Anil Kumble Circle at the other. Known as South Parade in pre-independence era, it was renamed as Mahatma Gandhi Road on 26 February 1948.

M. G. Road is also one of the busiest roads in the city and is lined on one side with retail stores, food outlets, restaurants and many more. It has many office buildings, shops and theatres. It is also a home to many buildings and banks. There are two Metro stations on M. G. Road, the eponymous station and Trinity. 

Presently, the M.G Road Boulevard is being reconstructed after construction of the MG Road Metro station was completed and services launched on 20 October 2011. The Bangalore Metro line that runs through MG Road, connects the eastern part of Bengaluru with the west.

Location

See also 
 Tourist attractions in Bangalore
 Mahatma Gandhi Road (Secunderabad)
 Brigade Road

References

External links

Roads in Bangalore
Shopping districts and streets in India